Ester Carloni (born as Esterina Carloni) ( 1904 – 6 April 1996) was an Italian actress. She appeared in more than forty films from 1958 to 1992. 

Her siblings Pietro, Adelina (or Adele), Maria and Ettore were fellow actors. Her brother Pietro married actress Titina De Filippo and her sister Adelina married Titina's brother actor Peppino De Filippo. Titina and Peppino were siblings of well-known actor Eduardo De Filippo.

Selected filmography

References

External links 

1904 births
1996 deaths
Italian film actresses
Actresses from Naples
Italian centenarians
Women centenarians